Valentin Viktorovich Volkov (born 23 January 1949) is a Russian professional football coach and a former player.

External links
 Career summary by KLISF

1949 births
Living people
Soviet footballers
FC Shinnik Yaroslavl players
Russian football managers
Association football defenders
FC Spartak Kostroma players